Donna Hartley-Wass MBE, born Donna-Marie Louise Murray and formerly known as Donna Hartley (1 May 1955 – 7 June 2013), was a British athlete.

Career
Hartley was born in Southampton, England in 1955. She was a south of England sprint champion, and won the AAA's 200 metres in 1972 then the 400 metres in 1975. In 1977 she was U.K. 400 metres champion. In 1977, she married fellow athlete Bill Hartley. The marriage later ended in divorce.

In 1978, Hartley won two Commonwealth gold medals in Edmonton, Canada, where she won the 400 metres, and the 4x400 relay. In 1979, she was European cup semi finalist winner in both 400, and 400 relay again. She also was runner up in European cup finals in 1975, and 1977 in 400, and 400 relay again.
Sponsored by the Midland Bank, Worked in Liverpool.
In 1980, she competed at the Moscow Olympic Games where she won a bronze medal in the 4 x 400 relay.

Later life
After retiring from athletics Hartley married Robert Wass, better known as comedian and actor Bobby Knutt. As Donna Hartley-Wass, she competed for several years on the UK women's body building circuit, winning the National Amateur Body Building Association's Miss Britain Physique trophy in 1988, having placed third the previous year. Her bodybuilding career was short-lived and for several years after that she ran a line dancing school in Sheffield near the family home. Hartley-Wass featured on the front cover of Health & Strength magazine.

Hartley trained at a Sheffield health studio jointly owned by Bobby Knutt. Under the guidance of the health studio owner and ex-Sheffield Wednesday coach Tony Toms, Hartley achieved national success very quickly on the women's bodybuilding circuit.

She died while sunbathing in her back garden on 7 June 2013, being discovered by her husband of 26 years.

Medals
Gold medalist (400 m relay) 1978 Commonwealth Games.
Bronze medalist (400 m relay).  1980 Olympic Games.

References

External links
British Olympic Association profile 
Donna Hartley's obituary

1955 births
2013 deaths
English female bodybuilders
English female sprinters
Olympic athletes of Great Britain
Olympic bronze medallists for Great Britain
Athletes (track and field) at the 1978 Commonwealth Games
Athletes (track and field) at the 1972 Summer Olympics
Athletes (track and field) at the 1976 Summer Olympics
Athletes (track and field) at the 1980 Summer Olympics
Sportspeople from Southampton
Commonwealth Games gold medallists for England
Commonwealth Games medallists in athletics
Members of the Order of the British Empire
Medalists at the 1980 Summer Olympics
Olympic bronze medalists in athletics (track and field)
Olympic female sprinters
Medallists at the 1978 Commonwealth Games